Margot Marsman (9 February 1932 – 5 September 2018) was a Dutch freestyle swimmer. She was part of the 4×100 m relay team that won a silver medal at the 1947 EuropeanChampionships and a bronze at the 1948 Summer Olympics.

References

1932 births
2018 deaths
Dutch female freestyle swimmers
Olympic swimmers of the Netherlands
Swimmers at the 1948 Summer Olympics
Olympic bronze medalists for the Netherlands
Olympic bronze medalists in swimming
Medalists at the 1948 Summer Olympics
Sportspeople from Haarlem
European Aquatics Championships medalists in swimming
20th-century Dutch women